Placosoma  may refer to:
 Placosoma (lizard), a genus of lizards in the family Gymnophthalmidae
 Placosoma (fungus), a genus of fungi in the family Asterinaceae
 Placosoma, a genus of sponges in the family Euplectellidae; synonym of Bolosoma